Mustafa İsmet İnönü (24 September 1884 – 25 December 1973) was a Turkish army officer and statesman who served as the second president of Turkey from 11 November 1938 to 22 May 1950, and its prime minister three times: from 1923 to 1924, 1925 to 1937, and 1961 to 1965.

İnönü is acknowledged by many as Mustafa Kemal Atatürk's right-hand man, with their friendship going back to the Gallipoli campaign. In the Greco-Turkish War of 1919–1922, he served as the first chief of the general staff from 1922 to 1924 for the regular Turkish army, during which he commanded the forces of the battles of First and Second İnönü. Mustafa Kemal bestowed İsmet with the surname İnönü, where the battles took place, when the 1934 Surname Law was adopted. He was also chief negotiator in the Mudanya and Lausanne conferences for the Ankara government, successfully negotiating away the Sevre treaty for the Treaty of Lausanne. As his prime minister for most of his presidency İnönü executed many of Atatürk's modernizing and nationalist reforms. İnönü gave the orders to carry out the Zilan Massacre.

As president and chairman of the Republican People's Party (CHP), İnönü initially continued Turkey's one party state. Kemalist style programs continued with great strides in education by supporting projects such as Village Institutes. His governments implemented notably heavy statist economic policies. The Hatay State was annexed in 1939, and Turkey was able to maintain an armed neutrality during World War II, joining the Allied powers only three months before the end of the European Theater. The Turkish Straits crisis prompted İnönü to build closer ties with the Western powers, with the country eventually joining NATO in 1952, though by then he was no longer president.

Factionalism between statists and liberals in the CHP lead to the creation of the Democrat Party in 1946. İnönü held the first multiparty elections in the Republic's history that year, beginning Turkey's multiparty period. 1950 saw a peaceful transfer of power to the Democrats when the CHP suffered defeat in the elections. For ten years İnönü served as the leader of the opposition before returning to power as prime minister following the 1961 election, held after the 1960 coup-d'état. The 1960s saw İnönü reinvent the CHP as a political party which was "Left of Center" as a new party cadre led by Bülent Ecevit became more influential. İnönü remained leader of the CHP until 1972, whereupon he was defeated by Ecevit in a leadership contest. He died on 25 December 1973 of a heart attack, at the age of 89, and is interred opposite to Atatürk's mausoleum at Anıtkabir in Ankara.

Early life (1884–1903) 
Mustafa İsmet was born in 1884 in Smyrna (İzmir) in the Aidin Vilayet to Hacı Reşit and Cevriye (later Cevriye Temelli). Hacı Reşit was retired after serving as director of the First Examinant Department of Legal Affairs Bureau of the War Ministry (Harbiye Nezareti Muhakemat Dairesi Birinci Mümeyyizliği). A member of the Kürümoğlu family of Bitlis, İsmet's father was born in Malatya. According to its members studying the ancestral background of the family, Kürümoğlus were of Turkish origin, while secondary sources refer to the family as of Kurdish descent. His mother was a daughter of Müderris Hasan Efendi who belonged to the ulema and was a member of a Bulgarian-Turkish family of Razgrad (present-day Bulgaria). İsmet was the family's second child, he had three brothers including the family's first child, Ahmet Midhat, two younger brothers Hasan Rıza and Hayri (Temelli), as well as a sister Seniha (Otakan). Due to his father's assignments, the family moved from one city to another.

Military career (1903–1923)

In the Ottoman Empire 

İsmet completed his primary education in Sivas and graduated from Sivas Military Junior High School (Sivas Askerî Rüştiyesi) in 1894. He then studied at Sivas School for Civil Servants (Sivas Mülkiye İdadisi) for a year. İsmet graduated from the Imperial School of Military Engineering in 1903 as lieutenant gunnery officer, and entered the Military Academy to graduate as a first rank staff captain on September 26, 1906. He started his duty in the Second Army based in Adrianople (Edirne) on October 2, 1906, in the 3rd Battery Command of the 8th Field Artillery Regiment. As part of his platoon officer staff internship he gave lessons in military strategy and artillery. Captain İsmet was also part of the Ottoman–Bulgarian commissions.

Through Ali Fethi (Okyar), İsmet briefly joined the Committee of Union and Progress in 1907, which wished to overthrow Sultan Abdul Hamid II. During the 31 March Incident, he was on the staff of the Second Cavalry Division which was mobilized to join the Action Army and marched on Constantinople (İstanbul) to depose Abdul Hamid II. Returning to Adrianople following the suppression of the mutiny, captain Mustafa İsmet left the committee in the summer of 1909.

He won his first military victory by suppressing Imam Yahya Muhammad Hamiddin's revolt in Yemen. İsmet eventually became chief of staff of the force sent to suppress the rebellion, and personally negotiated with Imam Yahya in Kaffet-ül-Uzer to bring Yemen back into the empire. For this he was promoted to the rank of major. He returned to Constantinople in March 1913 to defend the capital from Bulgarian attack during the First Balkan War. İsmet was part of the Turkish delegation that negotiated the Treaty of Constantinople with the Bulgarians as a military adviser. He held a close relationship with Enver Pasha and played an active role in the reformation of the army.

World War I 
İsmet began climbing the ranks during World War I, becoming lieutenant colonel on 29 November 1914 and then was appointed as the First Branch Manager of the General Headquarters on 2 December. He was appointed chief of staff of the Second Army on 9 October 1915 and was promoted to the rank of colonel on 14 December 1915.

İsmet began working with Mustafa Kemal (Atatürk) Pasha as a corps commander on the Caucasian Front. He was appointed to the IV Corps Command on 12 January 1917, upon the recommendation of Mustafa Kemal. He was recalled to Constantinople after a while, and returned to take part as a corps commander of Seventh Army. On 1 May, he was appointed to command XX Corps on the Palestine Front, and then III Corps on 20 June. He once again came in contact with Mustafa Kemal Pasha when he assumed the command of the Seventh Army. İsmet's forces received the brunt of Edmond Allenby's attack on Beersheba that ended the stalemate on the Sinai front. İsmet was wounded in the Battle of Megiddo and was sent back to Constantinople, where he was held various administrative positions in the War Ministry during the armistice period.

Turkish War of Independence 
After the military occupation of Constantinople on 16 March 1920, he decided to escape to Anatolia to join the Ankara government. He and his chief of staff major Saffet (Arıkan) escaped Maltepe in the evening of 19 March and arrived at Ankara on 9 April. He joined the Grand National Assembly (GNA) which was opened on 23 April 1920, as a deputy of Edirne. Like many others in the Turkish National Movement, he was sentenced to death in absentia by the Ottoman government on 6 June 1920.

In May 1920, he was appointed chief of the general staff. The next year he was appointed commander of the Western Front of the Army of the GNA, a position in which he remained during the Turkish War of Independence. He was promoted to the rank of Mirliva (to that extent, Pasha) after winning the First and Second Battle of İnönü. When the 1934 Surname Law was adopted Mustafa Kemal bestowed İsmet with the surname İnönü, where the battles took place.

İsmet Pasha was replaced by Mustafa Fevzi Pasha, who was also the prime minister and minister of defense at the time, as the chief of staff after the Turkish forces lost major battles against the advancing Greek Army in July 1921, as a result of which the cities Afyonkarahisar, Kütahya and Eskişehir were temporarily lost. During the war his infant son İzzet died before his victory in Sakarya and this news was only delivered to him on the spring of 1922 since his wife hid the news and the severity of his son's sickness when the clashes continued at full speed. He participated as a staff officer (with the rank Brigadier General) in the later battles, including Dumlupınar.

Chief negotiator in Mudanya and Lausanne 
After the War of Independence was won, İsmet Pasha was appointed as the chief negotiator of the Turkish delegation, both for the Armistice of Mudanya and for the Treaty of Lausanne.

The Lausanne conference convened in late 1922 to settle the terms of a new treaty that would take the place of the Treaty of Sèvres. İsmet became famous for his stubborn resolve in determining the position of Ankara as the legitimate, sovereign government of Turkey. After delivering his position, İsmet turned off his hearing aid during the speeches of British foreign secretary Lord Curzon. When Curzon had finished, İsmet reiterated his position as if Curzon had never said a word.

Prime minister (1923–1937) 
Mustafa İsmet (İnönü after 1934) served as the prime minister of Turkey throughout Mustafa Kemal Atatürk's presidency, stepping down as prime minister for three months during Fethi Okyar's premiership, and in the last year of Atatürk's presidency when he was replaced by Celal Bayar. İnönü therefore helped to execute most of Atatürk's reformist programs. It was his suggestion to make Ankara the capital of Turkey, which was approved by the parliament. İnönü was also an important factor in the proclamation of the Republic and the abolition of the Caliphate and Evkaf Ministry. He resigned from the premiership for health reasons on 22 November 1924 for Fethi Okyar, but since he wasn't able to achieve a vote of confidence from parliament due to the Sheikh Said rebellion, İnönü returned to the prime ministry.

İnönü immediately banned all opposition parties (including the Progressive Republican Party) and press. Independence Tribunals were reestablished to prosecute the Kurdish rebels. In 1926 it allegedly came out that former members of the Committee of Union and Progress attempted to assassinate Atatürk in the İzmir plot, which resulted in remaining CUP leaders being executed. İnönü retired his military command in 1927.

Nationalist policy 
While dealing with the Sheikh Said revolt İnönü proclaimed a Turkish nationalist policy and encouraged the turkification of the non-Turkish population. Following the suppression of the Sheikh Said rebellion, he presided over the Reform Council for the East which prepared the Report for Reform in the East, which recommended to impede an establishment of a Kurdish elite, to forbid non-Turkish languages and the creation of regional administrative units called Inspectorates-General, which were to be governed with martial law. He stated the following in regards to the Kurds; "we're frankly nationalists and nationalism is our only factor of cohesion. Before the Turkish majority other elements have no kind of influence. At any price, we must turkify the inhabitants of our land, and we will annihilate those who oppose" Following this report, three Inspectorates-Generals were established in the Kurdish areas comprising several provinces. On the direct order of İnönü the Zilan massacre of thousands of Kurdish civilians was perpetrated by the Turkish Land Forces in the Zilan Valley of Van Province on 12/13 July 1930, during the Ararat rebellion. Nation building was codified into law when a new settlement regime was enacted in 1934, resettling Albanians, Abkhazians, Circassians, and Kurds in new areas in order to create a homogeneous Turkish state.

Social policy 

İnönü was responsible for most of the reformist legislation promulgated during Turkey's one party period. The Hat Law and the closure of Dervish lodges were enacted in 1925, in 1928 the Turkish alphabet switched to being written with Latin characters, and in 1934 titles such as Efendi, Bey, and Pasha were abolished, and certain articles of religious clothing were banned. 1934 was also the year that the Surname Law was adopted, with Mustafa Kemal Atatürk bestowing İsmet with the surname İnönü, the location where İsmet won the battles against the Greek army in 1921. He was also a proponent of replacing foreign loan words with "Pure Turkish" words.

Economic policy 
İnönü managed the economy with heavy-handed government intervention, especially during the Great Depression, by implementing an economic plan inspired by the Five Year Plan of the Soviet Union. In doing so, he took much private property under government control. Due to his efforts, to this day, more than 70% of land in Turkey is still owned by the state.

Desiring a more liberal economic system, Atatürk dissolved the government of İnönü in 1937 and appointed Celâl Bayar, the founder of the first Turkish commercial bank Türkiye İş Bankası, as prime minister, thus beginning a decades long rivalry between Bayar and İnönü.

Presidency (1938–1950)

Prewar 
After the death of Atatürk on 10 November 1938, İnönü was viewed as the most appropriate candidate to succeed him, and was unanimously elected the second president of the Republic of Turkey and leader of the Republican People's Party (CHP). He attempted to build himself a cult of personality by receiving the official title of Millî Şef, i.e. "National Chief".

One of his first actions was to annex in 1939 the Hatay State, which declared independence from French Syria. İnönü also wished to move on from one party rule by taking incremental steps to multiparty politics. He hoped to accomplish this through establishing the Independent Group as a force of opposition in the parliament, but they fell short of expectations under war-time conditions. İnönü dismissed Bayar's government because of differences between the two on economic policy in 1939. İnönü was an avowed statist, while Bayar wished for a more liberal economy. Turkey's early industrialization accelerated under İnönü but the onset of World War II disrupted economic growth.

Much reform in education was accomplished during İnönü's presidency through the efforts of Hasan Âli Yücel, who was minister of education throughout İnönü's governments. 1940 saw the establishment of the Village Institutes, in which well performing students from the country side were selected to train as teachers and return to their hometown to run community development programs.

World War II

Foreign policy 

World War II broke out in the first year of his presidency, and both the Allies and the Axis pressured İnönü to bring Turkey into the war on their side. The Germans sent Franz von Papen to Ankara in April 1939 while the British sent Hughe Knatchbull-Hugessen and the French René Massigli. On 23 April 1939, Turkish Foreign Minister Şükrü Saracoğlu told Knatchbull-Hugessen of his nation's fears of Italian claims of the Mediterranean as Mare Nostrum and German control of the Balkans, and suggested an Anglo-Soviet-Turkish alliance as the best way of countering the Axis. In May 1939, during the visit of Maxime Weygand to Turkey, İnönü told the French Ambassador René Massigli that he believed that the best way of stopping Germany was an alliance of Turkey, the Soviet Union, France and Britain; that if such an alliance came into being, the Turks would allow Soviet ground and air forces onto their soil; and that he wanted a major programme of French military aid to modernize the Turkish armed forces.

The signing of the Molotov–Ribbentrop Pact on 23 August 1939 drew Turkey away from the Allies; the Turks always believed that it was essential to have the Soviet Union as an ally to counter Germany, and thus the signing of the German-Soviet pact undercut completely the assumptions behind Turkish security policy. With the signing of the Molotov–Ribbentrop pact, İnönü chose to be neutral in World War II as taking on Germany and the Soviet Union at the same time would be too much for Turkey, through he signed a tripartite treaty of alliance with Britain and France on 19 October 1939, obligating Turkey's entry into the war if fighting spread to the Mediterranean. However, with France's defeat in June 1940 İnönü abandoned the pro-Allied neutrality that he had followed since the beginning of the war. A major embarrassment for the Turks occurred in July 1940 when the Germans captured and published documents from the Quai d'Orsay in Paris showing the Turks were aware of Operation Pike—as the Anglo-French plan in the winter of 1939–40 to bomb the oil fields in the Soviet Union from Turkey was codenamed—which was intended by Berlin to worsen relations between Ankara and Moscow. In turn, worsening relations between the Soviet Union and Turkey were intended to drive Turkey into the arms of the Reich. After the publication of the French documents relating to Operation Pike, İnönü pulled out of the tripartide pact signed with Britain and France and signed the German–Turkish Treaty of Friendship and the Clodius Agreement, which placed Turkey within the German economic sphere of influence, but İnönü went no further towards the Axis.

In the first half of 1941, Germany which was intent upon invading the Soviet Union went out of its way to improve relations with Turkey as the Reich hoped for a benevolent Turkish neutrality when the German-Soviet war began. At the same time, the British had great hopes in the spring of 1941 when they dispatched an expeditionary force to Greece that İnönü could be persuaded to enter the war on the Allied side as the British leadership had high hopes of creating a Balkan front that would tie down German forces, and which thus led a major British diplomatic offensive with the Foreign Secretary Sir Anthony Eden visiting Ankara several times to meet with İnönü. İnönü always told Eden that the Turks would not join the British forces in Greece, and the Turks would only enter the war if Germany attacked Turkey. For his part, Papen offered İnönü parts of Greece if Turkey were to enter the war on the Axis side, an offer İnönü declined. In May 1941 when the Germans dispatched an expeditionary force to Iraq to fight against the British, İnönü refused Papen's request that the German forces be allowed transit rights to Iraq. Another attempt by Hitler to woo Turkey came in February 1943, when Talaat Pasha's remains were returned to Turkey for a state burial.

Internal opposition to Turkish neutrality came from ultra-nationalist circles and factions of the military that wished to incorporate the Turkic populated areas in the Soviet Union by allying with Germany. This almost erupted into a coup d'état against the government. Leading pan-Turkists including Alparslan Türkeş, Nihal Atsız, and Şaik Gökyay were arrested and sentenced time in prison in the Racism-Turanism trials.British Prime Minister Winston Churchill traveled to Ankara in January 1943 for a conference with President İnönu, to urge Turkey's entry into the war on the allied side. Churchill met secretly with İnönü inside a railroad car at the Yenice Station near Adana. By 4–6 December 1943, İnönü felt confident enough about the outcome of the war, that he met openly with Franklin D. Roosevelt and Winston Churchill at the Second Cairo Conference. Until 1941, both Roosevelt and Churchill had thought that Turkey's continuing neutrality would serve the interests of the Allies by blocking the Axis from reaching the strategic oil reserves of the Middle East. But the early victories of the Axis up to the end of 1942 caused Roosevelt and Churchill to re-evaluate a possible Turkish participation in the war on the side of the Allies. Turkey had maintained a decently-sized Army and Air Force throughout the war, and Churchill wanted the Turks to open a new front in the Balkans. Roosevelt, on the other hand, still believed that a Turkish attack would be too risky, and an eventual Turkish failure would have disastrous effects for the Allies.İnönü knew very well the hardships which his country had suffered during decades of incessant war between 1908 and 1922 and was determined to keep Turkey out of another war as long as he could. The young Turkish Republic was still re-building, recovering from the losses due to earlier wars, and lacked any modern weapons and the infrastructure to enter a war to be fought along and possibly within its borders. İnönü based his neutrality policy during the Second World War on the premise that Western Allies and the Soviet Union would sooner or later have a falling out after the war. Thus, İnönu wanted assurances on financial and military aid for Turkey, as well as a guarantee that the United States and the United Kingdom would stand beside Turkey in the event of a Soviet invasion of the Turkish Straits after the war. In August 1944 İnönü broke off diplomatic relations with Germany and on 5 January 1945, İnönü severed diplomatic relations with Japan. Shortly afterwards, İnönü allowed Allied shipping to use the Turkish straits to send supplies to the Soviet Union and on 25 February 1945 he declared war on Germany and Japan. For this Turkey became a founding member of the United Nations.

The post-war tensions and arguments surrounding the Turkish Straits would come to be known as the Turkish Straits crisis. The fear of Soviet invasion and Joseph Stalin's unconcealed desire for Soviet military bases in the Turkish Straits eventually caused Turkey to give up its principle of neutrality in foreign relations and join NATO in February 1952.

Domestic policy 
Maintaining an armed neutrality proved to be disruptive for the young republic. The country existed in a practical state of war throughout the Second World War: military production was prioritized at the expense of peacetime goods, rationing and curfews were implemented, and high taxes were put in place, causing severe economic hardship for many. One such tax was the Wealth Tax (Varlık Vergisi), a discriminatory tax which demanded very high one-time payments from Turkey's non-Muslim minorities. This tax is seen by many to be a continuation of the Jizya tax paid by dhimmis during Ottoman times, or Millî İktisat (National Economy) economic policy implemented by the Committee of Union and Progress regime three decades ago. It was only repealed in 1944 under American and British pressure.

A famous story of İnönü happened in a meeting in Bursa for the 1969 general elections. A young man yelled at him; "You let us go without food!" İnönü replied him by saying "Yes, I let you go without food, but I did not let you become fatherless" by implying the death of millions of people from both sides of World War II.

Post-War democratization 

For the Kemalists there was always a desire for Turkey to develop into a democracy. Before the Independent Group, Atatürk experimented with opposition through the Liberal Republican Party, which lasted three months before it had to be shut down when reactionaries threatened to hijack the party. In an opening speech to the Grand National Assembly on November 1, 1945, İnönü openly expressed the country's need for an opposition party. He welcomed Celal Bayar establishing the Democrat Party (DP), which separated from CHP. However, due to anti-Communist hysteria brought on by the new Soviet threat new leftist parties were swiftly banned and rural development initiatives such as the Village Institutes and People's Rooms were closed. Even with such pressure on the left, İnönü established the Ministry of Labour in 1945 and signed into law important protections for workers. Universities were given autonomy, and İnönü's title of "unchangeable chairman" of CHP was abolished.

İnönü allowed for Turkey's first multiparty elections to be held in 1946, however the elections were infamously not free and fair; voting was carried out under the gaze of onlookers who could determine which voters had voted for which parties, and where secrecy prevailed as to the subsequent counting of votes. Instead of inviting Şükrü Saraçoğlu to form another government, he assigned the CHP hardliner Recep Peker to the task, who contributed to a polarizing atmosphere in the parliament. İnönü had to act as a mediator several times between Peker and Bayar, who threatened to have the DP walk from parliament if they didn't have some of their demands met, such ensuring judicial review, secret ballots, and public counting for elections. On 12 July 1947 İsmet İnönü gave a speech broadcast on radio and newspapers that he would stand equal distance from the government and opposition, prompting Peker's resignation.

Free and fair national elections had to wait till 1950, and on that occasion İnönü's government was defeated. In the 1950 election campaign, the leading figures of the Democrat Party used the slogan: "Geldi İsmet, kesildi kısmet" ("İsmet arrived, [our] fortune left"). CHP lost the election with 41% of the vote against DP's 55%, but due to the winner-takes-all electoral system, DP received 85% of the seats in parliament. İnönü presided over the peaceful transfer of power to the DP leaders: Bayar and Adnan Menderes. Bayar would serve as Turkey's third president, and Menderes its first prime minister not from the CHP.

Leader of the opposition 

For ten years İnönü served as the leader of the opposition. In opposition, the CHP established its youth and women's branch. On 22 June 1953, the establishment of trade unions and vocational chambers was proposed, and the right to strike for workers was added to the party program.

In the lead up to the elections prepared for 1960, İnönü faced almost regular harassment from the authorities and DP supporters, to the point where he was almost lynched several times. İnönü was banned from 12 sessions of parliament. This coincided an authoritarian turn of the Democrat Party, which culminated in a coup against the government.

Second Republic 

On 27 May 1960, the Turkish Armed Forces overthrew the government. After one year of junta rule in which the Democrat Party was banned and its top leaders executed in the Yassıada Trials, elections were held once the military returned to their barracks. İnönü returned to power as Prime Minister after the 1961 election, in which CHP won the election. Right-wing parties have since continuously attacked İnönü and the CHP for their perceived involvement in the hanging of prime minister Menderes, even though İnönü advocated for Menderes' pardoning.

İnönü's governments were defined by an effort to deescalate tensions between radical forces in the Turkish army wishing for extended junta rule and former Democrats that wished for amnesty. İnönü's CHP did not gain enough seats in the legislature to win a majority in the elections, so in an effort to create reconciliation he formed coalition governments with the neo-Democrat Justice Party and New Turkey Party and the Republican Villagers Nation Party until 1965. Forming coalitions with DP successor parties however provoked radical officers into action. Aydemir was later executed for conducting both coups. Aydemir's 1962 coup had the most potential to succeed, when İnönü, President Cemal Gürsel and Chief of Staff Cevdet Sunay were held up in Çankaya Mansion by the putschists. Aydemir decided to let the group go, which foiled the coup.

While in coalition with the far-right Republican Villagers Nation Party, İnönü renounced the Greco-Turkish Treaty of Friendship of 1930 and took actions against the Greek minority. The Turkish government also strictly enforced a long‐overlooked law barring Greek nationals from 30 professions and occupations, for example Greeks could not be doctors, nurses, architects, shoemakers, tailors, plumbers, cabaret singers, ironsmiths, cooks, tourist guides, etc. and 50,000 more Greeks were deported. These actions were done because of the growing anti-Greek sentiment in Turkey after ethnic conflict in Cyprus flared up again. With invasion of the island imminent, American President Lyndon Johnson sent a memorandum to İnönü, effectively vetoing Turkish intervention. A subsequent meeting at the White House between İnönü and Johnson on 22 June 1964 meant Cyprus' status quo continued for another ten years. An event a couple years earlier also strained the other-wise amicable relationship İnönü held with Washington, that being the withdrawal of the nuclear armed PGM-19 Jupiter MRBMs briefly stationed in Turkey, which was undertaken in the aftermath of the Cuban Missile Crisis. While Washington withdrew the MRBMs, some B61 nuclear bombs are still stored in İncirlik Air Base.

İnönü's governments established the National Security Council, Turkish Statistical Institute, and Turkey's leading research institute TÜBİTAK. Turkey signed the Ankara agreement, the first treaty of cooperation with the European Economic Community, and also increased ties with Iran and Pakistan. The army was modernized and the National Intelligence Organization was founded.  İnönü was instrumental in establishing CHP as "Left of Center" on the political spectrum as a new left-wing party cadre led by his protégé Bülent Ecevit became more influential. İnönü survived an assassination attempt from a Menderes supporter in 1964.

İnönü returned to the opposition after losing both the 1965 and 1969 general elections to a much younger man, Justice Party leader Süleyman Demirel. He remained leader of CHP until 1972, whereupon an interparty crisis over his endorsement of the 1971 military memorandum lead to his defeat by Ecevit in the 5th extraordinary CHP convention. This was the first overthrow of a party leader in a leadership contest in the Republic's history. İnönü left his party and resigned his parliamentarianship afterwords. Being a former president he was a member of the Senate in the last year of his life.

Death 
On 25 December 1973 İsmet İnönü died of a heart attack at the age of 89. The parliament declared national mourning until his burial. He was interred at Anıtkabir opposite to Atatürk's mausoleum on 28 December. Following the 1980 coup, Kenan Evren transferred twelve graves from Anıtkabir, but kept İnönü's in place. İnönü's tomb took its present shape in January 1997.

Legacy 

İnönü University and Malatya İnönü Stadium in Malatya are named after him, as is the İnönü Stadium in Istanbul, home of the Beşiktaş football club.

Portrayal 
Australian actor Gerard Kennedy was Colonel Ismet Bey in 1987's The Lighthorsemen.

Personal life 

A highly educated man, İnönü was able to speak fluently in Arabic, English, French and German in addition to his native Turkish. During the Great War, on 13 April 1916, İsmet married Emine Mevhibe, who was a daughter of an Eşraf of Ziştovi (present day Svishtov) Zühtü Efendi. They had 4 children: İzzet (died in infacy), Ömer, Erdal and Özden (married to Metin Toker). Erdal İnönü became a physicist and later a statesman, serving as secretary general of the CHP successor parties SODEP and SHP, which merged with the revived CHP.

İnönü had a slight build, and had a hearing impairment that he used to his advantage in negotiations, most famously during the Lausanne Conference. For this he was known as "The Old Fox". İnönü became a fan of western Classical Music while stationed in Yemen, an interest that persisted during his presidency.

Honours

National Honours 
  Turkey :  Medal of Independence, November 21, 1923

Gallery

See also 
 Pembe Köşk – Private home from 1925 to 1973
 Çankaya Köşkü – The Presidency of the Republic of Turkey
 List of high-ranking commanders of the Turkish War of Independence

References

Sources

Further reading 
 Kinross, Lord, Atatürk: A Biography of Mustafa Kemal, Father of Modern Turkey (New York: William Morrow & Company, 1965).
 Liebmann, George W. Diplomacy between the Wars: Five Diplomats and the Shaping of the Modern World (London I. B. Tauris, 2008)
 Mango, Andrew, The Turks Today (New York: The Overlook Press, 2004). .
 Pope, Nicole and Pope, Hugh, Turkey Unveiled: A History of Modern Turkey (New York: The Overlook Press, 2004). .

External links 

 Biography  (İsmet İnönü Foundation)
 

 
1884 births
1973 deaths
20th-century prime ministers of Turkey
20th-century presidents of Turkey
People from İzmir
People from Aidin vilayet
Turkish Kurdish politicians
Bulgarian Turks in Turkey
Ottoman Imperial School of Military Engineering alumni
Ottoman Military College alumni
Ottoman Army officers
Ottoman military personnel of World War I
Turkish Army generals
Turkish military personnel of the Greco-Turkish War (1919–1922)
Republican People's Party (Turkey) politicians
Chiefs of the Turkish General Staff
Government ministers of Turkey
Ministers of Foreign Affairs of Turkey
Ministers of National Education of Turkey
Leaders of the Republican People's Party (Turkey)
World War II political leaders
Recipients of the Medal of Independence with Red-Green Ribbon (Turkey)
Leaders of the Opposition (Turkey)
Deputies of Ankara
Deputies of Malatya
People of the Dersim rebellion
Turkish Sunni Muslims
Members of the 1st government of Turkey
Members of the 2nd government of Turkey
Members of the 4th government of Turkey
Members of the 5th government of Turkey
Members of the 6th government of Turkey
Members of the 7th government of Turkey
Members of the 8th government of Turkey
Members of the 26th government of Turkey
Members of the 27th government of Turkey
Members of the 28th government of Turkey
Members of the 2nd Parliament of Turkey
Turkish nationalists